Little Jacques (French: Le petit Jacques) is a 1953 French drama film directed by Robert Bibal and starring Jean-Pierre Kérien, Blanchette Brunoy and Christian Fourcade.

Cast
 Jean-Pierre Kérien as Noël Rambert  
 Blanchette Brunoy as Marthe Rambert 
 Christian Fourcade as Le petit Jacques Rambert  
 Howard Vernon as Daniel Mortal 
 Micheline Francey as Claire Mortal  
 Célia Cortez as Mlle Edmée, l'assistante  
 Pierre Jourdan as Paul Laverdac  
 Jean Tissier as Le juge d'instruction Dubois  
 Jacques Charon as L'avocat de la défense Me. Merlin  
 Lucien Nat as Le procureur  
 Charles Roy as Le docteur Dr. Arthez 
 Odette Barencey as La concierge 
 Charles Bayard as Un actionnaire  
 Louise Bazin 
 Robert Charlet 
 Emile Dars 
 Paul Demange as Le vieux beau  
 Pierre Larquey 
 Charles Lemontier as L'aumônier 
 Mag-Avril as La caissière  
 Jacques Mattler 
 Mick Micheyl as La chanteuse  
 Jean-Michel Rankovitch as Gobergeau  
 Guy Saint-Clair 
 André Saint-Luc 
 Gabriel Sardet as Le président

References

Bibliography 
 Parish, Robert. Film Actors Guide. Scarecrow Press, 1977.

External links 
 

1953 drama films
French drama films
1953 films
1950s French-language films
Films directed by Robert Bibal
French black-and-white films
1950s French films